Love Without Pity (French title: Un monde sans pitié) is a 1989 French romantic comedy film written and directed by Éric Rochant.

Cast 
 Hippolyte Girardot as Hippo  
 Mireille Perrier as Nathalie 
 Yvan Attal as Halpern  
 Jean-Marie Rollin as Xavier 
 Cécile Mazan as Francine 
 Aline Still as La mère  
 Paul Pavel as Le père   
 Anne Kessler as Adeline     
 Patrick Blondel as J.F. 
 Paul Bisciglia as L'homme de L'Humanité

Accolades

References

External links 
 

1989 films
1989 romantic comedy films
1980s French-language films
French romantic comedy films
Films directed by Éric Rochant
Best First Feature Film César Award winners
French coming-of-age comedy films
Louis Delluc Prize winners
1989 directorial debut films
1980s coming-of-age comedy films
1980s French films